The Lower Basin Historic District is a national historic district located in Lynchburg, Virginia. The district defines a commercial and industrial warehouse area located between the downtown commercial area to the south and the James River waterfront to the north.  The district contains a variety of mostly late 19th- and early 20th-century, multi-story, brick warehouses and factories, two-to-three-story brick
commercial buildings, and a number of structures associated with the James River and Kanawha Canal and the Norfolk and Western and Chesapeake and Ohio Railways. The district is named for a wide basin of the canal that once extended between Ninth Street and Horseford Road, and contains 60 contributing buildings, two contributing structures (a viaduct and a stone bridge), and one contributing object-a monument commemorating the site of 18th-century Lynch's Ferry.

It was listed on the National Register of Historic Places in 1987, with the boundary increased in 2002, and two additional resources added in 2008.

References

Historic districts in Lynchburg, Virginia
Italianate architecture in Virginia
Romanesque Revival architecture in Virginia
Buildings and structures in Lynchburg, Virginia
National Register of Historic Places in Lynchburg, Virginia
Historic districts on the National Register of Historic Places in Virginia